Fish Police is an American animated television series produced by Hanna-Barbera and based on the comic book series of the same name created by Steve Moncuse. It first aired on CBS in 1992, broadcasting three episodes before being axed for low ratings. A further three episodes never aired in the United States, although the entire series ran in European syndication. 

The show has a decidedly more mature tone than most other animated Hanna-Barbera shows; episodes often contained innuendo and mild profanity.

The series was part of a spate of attempts by major networks to develop prime time animated shows to compete with the success of Fox's The Simpsons, alongside ABC's Capitol Critters and CBS's Family Dog.  Hanna-Barbera Productions pitched the series to CBS Entertainment, which agreed to pick it up.  All three were canceled in their first seasons.

Plot
Beneath the ocean, a fish named Inspector Gil works for his police department under Chief Abalone. He solves the various crimes in his city while tangling with Biscotti Calamari.

Characters

Main characters
 Inspector Gil (voiced by John Ritter) - The main protagonist of the series. Gil is a detective in a similar mold of classic film noir stylings. He sees things as very black and white, demonstrated by his 'good/bad' narratives during episodes. He has been in a relationship with Pearl for five years (to which some have joked that they should have been married by now) and maintains a flirtatious 'friendship' with Angel. Dialogue in the first episode implies that he is friends with several other fictional characters such as Fred Flintstone and Kermit the Frog.
 Biscotti Calamari (voiced by Héctor Elizondo) - A squid crime boss who keeps his operations extremely discreet. He is confident that the police can never touch him for any of his crimes and even appears to contribute towards them occasionally, believing it is better to be on their good side should he ever need them. This has led Gil, Catfish, and Abalone to take a great disliking to him and his methods.
 Sharkster (voiced by Tim Curry) - Calamari's sleazy smooth-talking shark lawyer. He is quick to defend his client in whatever way possible, but does so in the slimiest of manners, seemingly knowing that his client can commit any crime and get away with it. Sharkster frequently uses his knowledge of the law to cause headaches and obstacles for Gil, causing the two to dislike each other greatly. Tim Curry and John Ritter had previously co-starred together in 1990 in It and later in a 1997 episode of Over the Top. The two remained good friends until Ritter's death.
 Mussels Marinara (voiced by Frank Welker) - Calamari's dim-witted and overweight bodyguard.
 Chief Abalone (voiced by Ed Asner) - The angry, ill-tempered chief of police at Gil's precinct. He appears to dislike his staff, but secretly has faith in them, particularly in Gil.
 Mayor Cod (voiced by Jonathan Winters) - As his title implies, Cod is the Mayor of Fish City. Despite this however, he is rather cowardly and somewhat inept when it comes to his job.
 Detective Catfish (voiced by Robert Guillaume) - An undercover officer at Gil's precinct, he's known Gil for quite some time and they appear to be good friends, demonstrated when he is visibly saddened when Gil is sent to prison for crimes committed by an impostor. Among his disguises, he occasionally dresses in drag. His design is identical to Gil's appearance in the original comics.
 Crabby (voiced by Buddy Hackett) - An old, bitter, crab taxi driver who frequents Pearl's diner as well as other areas Gil visits. He occasionally offers helpful information to related cases of Gil's during his rantings.
 Pearl White (voiced by Megan Mullally) - The owner of her own diner that Gil frequents; she is also his main love interest, with them having been in an on-again, off-again relationship for 5 years. She often wishes for Gil to become a more exciting person as she feels their relationship has become predictable. She finds a rival in Angel, getting jealous of her constant flirting with Gil.
 Angel Jones (voiced by JoBeth Williams) - The lead singer at Calamari's club and another love interest for Gil. Despite his protests in the first episode that they are just friends, Angel strongly hints at being interested in Gil with her constant seductive flirting with him throughout the entire series. She has a very voluptuous figure and seems to be slightly inspired by Jessica Rabbit. The series itself makes note of this in the first episode, where she parodies Jessica's infamous 'I'm not bad...' line.
 Goldie (voiced by Georgia Brown) - The secretary of the police station. Goldie is a widow, having been married at least 5 times. She usually makes very dry, witty, and sarcastic remarks towards her colleagues.
 Tadpole (voiced by Charlie Schlatter) - Pearl's younger brother who works at the precinct with Gil. He usually seems to know exactly what Gil or anyone else is thinking whenever he is given an order (a running gag in the series is a character wondering aloud, "How does [he] do that?!") and seems to work in forensics.
 Connie Koi - A news reporter, she often shows up to provide exposition.

Guest characters
 Inspector C. Bass (voiced by Phil Hartman) - A casanova of a cop who is transferred to Fish Police and partnered with Gil to investigate the smuggling of gold bullion. He is secretly corrupt.
 The Codfather - A high-ranking mob boss on the run from FBI agents for unpaid taxes. He stages his own murder and frames Calamari for it, but his ego proves to be his downfall.
 Julius Kelp - One of the Codfather's subordinates who helps him forge his death certificate.
 Bill (voiced by John Ritter) - A small-time thug who resembles Gil. Calamari performs plastic surgery on him to make him into a doppelgänger for Gil and to serve as a mole for him.
 The Widow Casino (voiced by B.J. Ward) - A socialite who conspires with Calamari to murder her husband, Clams Casino, but later tricked by Gil into thinking Calamari betrayed her (which he had).
 Richie (voiced by Rob Paulsen) - Calamari's favorite nephew. He is intelligent and shares his uncle's business acumen, while his two younger brothers, Buddy and Elvis, are the exact opposite.
 Donna (voiced by Kimmy Robertson) - A waitress working for Calamari who begins committing robberies to gain Calamari's approval.
 W. K. the Weenie King (voiced by George Hearn) - The host of the annual Fish City Beauty Contest and an idol of Gil's since his childhood.
 Shelly - The original "Waltzing Weenie". After 20 years of service, W. K. fires her because she "couldn't cut the mustard" anymore, driving her to a life of crime.
 Father Fluke - The man who knows everything about everyone alive or dead. He is one of Gil's sources for information.

Episodes

Cast
 John Ritter as Inspector Gil
 Edward Asner as Chief Abalone
 Georgia Brown as Goldie
 Tim Curry as Sharkster
 Héctor Elizondo as Calamari
 Robert Guillaume as Detective Catfish
 Buddy Hackett as Crabby
 Megan Mullally as Pearl
 Charlie Schlatter as Tadpole
 Frank Welker as Mussels Marinara
 JoBeth Williams as Angel
 Jonathan Winters as Mayor Cod

Critical reception
Critics' opinions were mixed to negative. Ken Tucker of Entertainment Weekly gave the show a "C", saying that the "comics are a lot more varied and better constructed — their plots worked as mysteries, whereas here the stories are just excuses for more fish humor." Marion Garmel of the Indianapolis Star thought that the show lacked the "dark edge" of the comics. In a 2010 interview, Moncuse said of the show, "The less said about the animated series the better."

See also
 List of works produced by Hanna-Barbera Productions

References

External links
 

1992 American television series debuts
1992 American television series endings
1990s American adult animated television series
1990s American animated comedy television series
American adult animated comedy television series
English-language television shows
CBS original programming
Television shows based on comics
Television series by Hanna-Barbera
1990s American police comedy television series
Animated television series about fish